Soul to Soul may refer to:

Film and TV
 Soul to Soul (film), a 1971 concert by African-American artists in Ghana and a documentary film of the concert

Music
Soul to Soul (soundtrack), a 1971 live album by various artists from the accompanying film
Soul to Soul (album), a 1985 album by American blues guitarist Stevie Ray Vaughan
 Soul II Soul, a British dance band popular in the late 1980s and early 1990s
 Soul2Soul Tour (2000) or Soul2Soul II Tour (2006–07), co-headlining tours by country music singers Tim McGraw and Faith Hill

Songs
 "Soul to Soul", a song by Another Pretty Face	1981
 "Soul to Soul", a song by Boz Scaggs	1988
 "Soul to Soul", a song by The Cockroaches	1990
 "Soul to Soul", a song by Michael Zager 1978
 "Soul to Soul", a song by The Temptations	1990
 "Soul to Soul", a song by Krokus from To Rock or Not to Be

Organizations
 Nefesh B'Nefesh (Hebrew for "Soul to Soul"), a Zionist organization